United Nations Security Council Resolution 119 was proposed by the United States on 31 October 1956. Considering the grave situation created by action undertaken against Egypt and the lack of unanimity of its permanent members at previous meetings, the Council felt it had been prevented from exercising its responsibility for the maintenance of international peace and security. As a solution, the Council decided to call an emergency special session of the General Assembly in order to make appropriate recommendations.

Even though France and United Kingdom voted "against" they could not block the summoning of the General Assembly as it was a procedural vote, which cannot be vetoed by permanent members.

See also
 List of United Nations Security Council Resolutions 101 to 200 (1953–1965)
 Protocol of Sèvres
 Suez Crisis

References

External links
 
 Text of the Resolution at undocs.org

 0119
Suez Crisis
 0119
1956 in Egypt
October 1956 events